The Coupe de Calédonie (English: Cup of New Caledonia) is New Caledonia's premier knockout tournament in men's football. It was created in 1954, and gives the winner of the tournament a berth in the Coupe de France.

Previous winners
1954: Indépendante 5-3 Uniforme Fayaoué (Ouvéa)
1955: no tournament
1956: PLGC 2-1 Ouvéa (island selection)
1957: Impassible 5-2 PLGC
1958: PLGC 6-0 Impassible
1959: Wé (Lifou) 4-2 Impassible
1960: Uniforme Fayaoué (Ouvéa) 4-2 Indépendante (aet)
1961: Ile des Pins 3-2 Impassible
1962: Olympique Nouméa 5-0 PLGC
1963: Olympique Nouméa 5-1 Ile des Pins
1964: JS Vallée du Tir Nouméa 1-0 USC Nouméa
1965: JS Vallée du Tir Nouméa 5-2 Ile des Pins
1966: JS Vallée du Tir Nouméa 3-0 Thio Sport
1967: JS Vallée du Tir Nouméa 1-0 CSM
1968: JS Vallée du Tir Nouméa 3-2 ASLN Nouméa
1969: ASLN Nouméa 2-1 JS Vallée du Tir Nouméa
1970: ASLN Nouméa 3-1 Nathalo (Lifou)
1971: ASLN Nouméa 2-1 FC Gaitcha
1972: ASLN Nouméa 4-0 CB Ponérihouen
1973: UAC Yaté 1-0 JS Vallée du Tir Nouméa
1974: UAC Yaté 5-2 ASLN Nouméa (aet)
1975: ASLN Nouméa 1-0 JS Vallée du Tir Nouméa
1976: Kehdek Koumac 2-1 ASLN Nouméa
1977: USL Gélima 2-1 ASLN Nouméa
1978: USL Gélima 4-1 JS Maré Nouméa
1979: USL Gélima 3-0 JS Maré Nouméa
1980: JS Baco 3-2 CA Saint-Louis (aet)
1981: CA Saint-Louis 2-1 AS Ponoz
1982: USL Gélima 1-1 JS Baco (aet, 3-0 on pens)
1983: AS Païta 2-0 CB Ponérihouen
1984: JS Baco 2-0 AS Kunié
1985: CA Saint-Louis 3-1 AS Kunié
1986: CA Saint-Louis 3-0 AS 6e km
1987: JS Baco 2-0 AS Kunié
1988: Wé-Luécilla (Lifou) 1-0 CA Saint-Louis
1989: AS Frégate Mont-Dore 3-2 JS Baco
1990: CA Saint-Louis 1-0 Entente Gélima
1991: JS Baco 3-1 AS Magenta Le Nickel
1992: Wé-Luécilla (Lifou) 3-0 AS Kunié
1993: ASLN Thio 4-1 CA Saint-Louis
1994: CA Saint-Louis 5-1 AS Qanono
1995: JS Baco 3-2 Wé-Luécilla (Lifou)
1996: AS Magenta 3-0 Uniforme Fayaoué (Ouvéa)
1997: CA Saint-Louis 1-1 FC Gaitcha (aet, 4-3 on pens)
1998: JS Traput (Lifou) 1-1 CS Nékoué (aet, 5-4 on pens)
1999: JS Traput (Lifou) 1-0 AS Auteuil (aet)
2000: AS Magenta 1-1 JS Traput (Lifou) (aet, 4-1 pens)    
2001: AS Magenta 4-3 AS Mont-Dore
2002: AS Magenta 5-2 JS Ouvéa
2002–03: AS Magenta 1-0 JS Baco
2003–04: AS Magenta 2-1 AS Mont-Dore 
2004–05: AS Magenta 2-1 JS Baco
2005–06: AS Mont-Dore 2-1 JS Baco (aet)
2006–07: AS Lössi 1-0 AS Mont-Dore
2007–08: AS Mont-Dore 3-0 AS Lössi
2008–09: AS Mont-Dore 3-3 AS Magenta (aet, 4-2 pens)
2010: AS Magenta 2–1 Gaïtcha FCN
2011: Gaïtcha FCN 2-0 AS Magenta
2012: AS Lössi 1-1 AS Magenta (aet, 3-2 pens)
2013: Hienghène Sport 3-1 AS Qanono
2014: AS Magenta 3–1 AS Lössi
2015: Hienghène Sport 3–0 AS Mont-Dore
2016: AS Magenta 2–2 Hienghène Sport (aet, 4–3 pens)
2017: AS Lössi 2-1 Hienghène Sport
2018: AS Magenta 1–0 Hienghène Sport
2019: Hienghène Sport 5–3 AS Lössi
2020: Hienghène Sport 3-1 SC Ne Drehu
2022: Hienghène Sport 4-3 AS Tiga Sport

References

External links
New Caledonia - List of Cup Finals, RSSSF.com

Football competitions in New Caledonia
National association football cups
New
1954 establishments in New Caledonia
Recurring sporting events established in 1954